John Bugeja (born 1 December 1932) is a former Maltese cyclist. He competed in the individual road race and team time trial events at the 1960 Summer Olympics.

References

External links
 

1932 births
Living people
Maltese male cyclists
Olympic cyclists of Malta
Cyclists at the 1960 Summer Olympics
Place of birth missing (living people)